Tanya Denise Tucker (born October 10, 1958) is an American country music singer and songwriter who had her first hit, "Delta Dawn", in 1972 at the age of 13. Over the succeeding decades, Tucker became one of the few child performers to mature into adulthood without losing her audience, and during the course of her career, she notched a streak of top-10 and top-40 hits.
She has had several successful albums, several Country Music Association award nominations, and hit songs such as 1973's "What's Your Mama's Name?" and "Blood Red and Goin' Down", 1975's "Lizzie and the Rainman", 1988's "Strong Enough to Bend", and 1992's "Two Sparrows in a Hurricane". Tucker's 2019 album While I'm Livin' won the Grammy Award for Best Country Album, and "Bring My Flowers Now" from that same album won Tucker a shared songwriting Grammy for Best Country Song. Tucker's documentary The Return of Tanya Tucker Featuring Brandi Carlile was released to theaters Fall 2022.

Early life
She was born in Seminole, Texas, United States, the youngest of three children born to Jesse "Beau" and Juanita Tucker. Her father was a heavy equipment operator, and the family moved often as he sought better work. Tanya's early childhood was spent primarily in Willcox, Arizona, where the only radio station in town, KHIL, played country music. The Tuckers attended concerts of country stars such as Ernest Tubb and Mel Tillis, and Tanya's sister LaCosta was praised in the family for her vocal abilities. At the age of eight, Tanya told her father that she also wanted to be a country singer when she grew up.

When the Tuckers moved to St. George, Utah, Juanita took Tanya to audition for the film Jeremiah Johnson. Tanya did not win the bigger role for which she tried out, but she was hired, as was her horse, as a bit player. About this time, she also received one of her first musical breaks, when her father drove the family to Phoenix for the Arizona State Fair, on the chance that the featured performer, country singer Judy Lynn, could use Tanya in her show. Tanya sang for the fair's entertainment managers, and she was engaged to sing at the fair itself.

Tucker made her debut with Mel Tillis, who was so impressed by her talent that he invited her onstage to perform. In 1969, the family moved to Henderson, Nevada, where Tucker regularly performed. Eventually, she recorded a demonstration tape that gained the attention of songwriter Dolores Fuller, who sent it to producer Billy Sherrill, the head of artists and repertoire at CBS Records. Sherrill was impressed with the demo tape and signed the teenage vocalist to Columbia Records.

Career

1972–1979: Teen country star

Sherrill initially planned to have Tucker record "The Happiest Girl in the Whole USA", but she chose "Delta Dawn"a song Billy Sherrill heard Bette Midler sing on The Tonight Showinstead as her first single, while Donna Fargo the writer of "The Happiest Girl in the Whole USA" released her own version as a single. Released in May 1972, the song became a hit, peaking at number six on the country chart and scraping the bottom of the pop chart. At first, Columbia Records tried to downplay Tucker's age, but soon word leaked out and she became a  sensation. A year later, Australian singer Helen Reddy scored a number-one U.S. pop hit with her version of "Delta Dawn".

"I thank the lucky stars and the Good Lord for that song," Tucker told Nine-O-One Network Magazine in 1988. "If I cut it now for the first time I think it would be a hit. I was fortunate to have latched onto that one, and that was all Sherrill's doing. If it hadn't been for Sherrill, I probably would have been a rodeo queen or something."

Her second single, "Love's the Answer", also became a top-10 hit later in 1972. Tucker's third single, "What's Your Mama's Name", became her first number-one hit in the spring of 1973. Two other number ones"Blood Red and Goin' Down" and "Would You Lay with Me (In a Field of Stone)" followed, establishing Tucker as a major star.

In 1975, she signed with MCA Records, where she had a string of hit singles that ran into the late 1970s.

Among these hits was "Lizzie and the Rainman", which became a number-one country hit, and also became Tucker's only top-40 pop music hit, peaking at number 37. It also peaked among the top 10 on the adult contemporary charts at the time. Tucker has a string of top-10 country hits under MCA between 1975 and 1978, including "San Antonio Stroll", "Here's Some Love", and "It's a Cowboy Lovin' Night".

In 1978, she decided to radically change her image and cross over to rock with her TNT album. Despite the controversy over the record and its sexy cover, it went gold the following year.

The two hit singles from the album were "I'm a Singer, You're the Song", and "Texas (When I Die)". The latter reached number five on the country charts, and its B-side, "Not Fade Away", a Buddy Holly cover, peaked at number 70 on the Billboard Hot 100.

1979–1984: Sales decline and personal battles
By the end of the 1970s, her sales were decliningin 1980 she only had two hits, one of them was "Can I See You Tonight?". Also in 1980, she recorded a few singles with Glen Campbell, with whom she was romantically linked. In addition to recording, she also made her feature-film debut in Hard Country, although she did have small roles in Jeremiah Johnson (1972) and the television miniseries The Rebels (1979).

She also had begun drinking in her late teens, and she explained how it started:  "You send your ass out on the road doing two gigs a night and after all that adoration go back to empty hotel rooms. Loneliness got me into it." 

In 1978, Tucker moved to Los Angeles to try, unsuccessfully, to broaden her appeal to pop audiences, and was quickly captivated by the city's nightlife. She also said that she "was the wildest thing out there. I could stay up longer, drink more and kick the biggest ass in town. I was on the ragged edge." 

Despite having a top 10 hit in March 1983 ("Feel Right")  from her first and only Arista album Changes, she struggled to have her music played on the radio. By mid-1983, her singles were no longer making the top 40.

She moved to Nashville after her breakup with Campbell in 1982 and began to lead a more secluded life. Finally, in 1988, her family confronted her and persuaded her to enter the Betty Ford Center.

1986–1997: Comeback
In 1986, Tucker signed with Capitol Records; she returned to the charts with "One Love at a Time", which climbed to number three. Her career was revitalized with 1986's Girls Like Me, an album that spawned four top-10 country singles. In 1988, she had three number-one country singles: "I Won't Take Less Than Your Love" (with Paul Davis and Paul Overstreet), "If It Don't Come Easy", and "Strong Enough to Bend".

Her music was now more country pop-styled and up-tempo, but this material made Tucker popular again. Between 1988 and 1989, Tucker enjoyed one of her most popular years on the charts, racking up eight country top-10 hits in a row. Her albums around this time were also achieving "Gold" certifications by the RIAA, after selling 500,000 copies. A Greatest Hits album followed in 1989. It also contained a new single called "My Arms Stay Open All Night". Radio responded well; the song peaked at number two.

In 1988, Tucker was nominated by the Country Music Association for "Female Vocalist of the Year", and was nominated for other major awards during this time. Her contribution to the country music genre was rewarded when the Country Music Association voted her the "Female Vocalist of the Year" in 1991, though she missed the event, having just given birth to her second child. Eight consecutive singles reached the top 10 in the early 1990s, including "Down to My Last Teardrop", "(Without You) What Do I Do with Me", and "Two Sparrows in a Hurricane". In 1990, Tucker was named "Female Video Artist of the Year" by CMT. Although by the 1990s, she no longer had number-one hits, many singles came close peaking in the country top five, as well as the top 10. Tucker was one of the most successful female country artists at the time. She became one of the few teen stars to find success in her adult years.

Her 1993 album Greatest Hits 1990-1992 rose to number 15, and also went to number 18 on the Top Country Albums chart. Liberty Records was changed to Capitol Nashville in 1994.

By the 1990s, Tucker was a 20-year veteran in country music, though she was only in her mid-30s. In 1994, "Hangin' In" was her last top-five hit, as well as her last top-10 hit for a while. That year, she performed at the half-time show at Super Bowl XXVIII. In 1996, she was one of the top-10 most-played artists of the year, and at the time was also  Capitol Records' biggest signed female artist. In 1997, she returned to the top 10 on the country charts for the last time with the hit, "Little Things", which peaked at number nine. That year she was inducted into the Texas Country Music Hall of Fame.

2000–present: Music career today

In 2002, Tucker founded Tuckertime Records, allowing her to retain control of the recording process and release the singles she wished to release. The same year, she issued Tanya, her first album in five years, which was distributed through Capitol Records.

In 2002, Tucker was ranked number 20 on CMT's 40 Greatest Women of Country Music. In 2005, she released an album, Live at Billy Bob's Texas. In 2005, she also contributed two songs to a tribute album to Bob Wills, called A Tribute to Bob Wills 100th Anniversary. In 2005, she released a book, 100 Ways to Beat the Blues on Fireside, which included tips on shaking the blues, from some of Tucker's friends such as Willie Nelson, Brenda Lee, Little Richard, and Burt Reynolds.

Tucker recorded an album, Lonesome Town, which has been put on hold, but a live concert recorded at the Renaissance Center in December was to be released. Tucker sang a duet with country music artist Billy Joe Shaver, of Shaver's song, "Played the Game Too Long", on his latest album, Everybody's Brother, that was released in September 2007.

In 2009, Tucker signed a one-time deal with Saguaro Road Records from Time-Life. Tanya's "Lonesome Town" project was put on hold to do the first cover album of her career, My Turn, which was released in June 2009 and placed number 27 on the Billboard country charts. The first single, "Love's Gonna Live Here", was released to radio and was also available as a digital single. It is a remake of the classic hit by Buck Owens. The album includes classic country hits such as "Wine Me Up", "Lovesick Blues", "You Don't Know Me", "Ramblin' Fever", "Walk Through This World With Me", "Big Big Love", "Crazy Arms", "After The Fire Is Gone", and "Oh Lonesome Me".

Tucker appeared on Terri Clark's 2012 album Classic in a remake duet of her first single "Delta Dawn".

In June 2017, Tucker was featured in Rolling Stone as one of the 100 Greatest Country Artists of All Time.

After the death of former flame Glen Campbell on August 8, 2017, Tucker released her first single since 2009, "Forever Loving You", a song co-penned by Tennessee State Senator Rusty Crowe. The song's release the following day, on the eve of Campbell's funeral, drew ire and criticism being exploitative. Tucker claimed that a portion of the proceeds will benefit the Alzheimer's Foundation of America, but the foundation stated it was not involved in the promotion and has not received any funds.

Tucker released While I'm Livin', her first collection of original material since 2002's Tanya, in 2019 via Fantasy Records. It was produced by Shooter Jennings and Brandi Carlile, with Carlile brought onto the project after initially being approached for songs by Jennings but after having professed such an admiration of Tucker and her work, Jennings felt it necessary for her to co-produce the record alongside him. Tucker performed "Bring My Flowers Now" at Loretta Lynn's all-star 87th birthday concert at Nashville's Bridgestone Arena with Carlile playing piano. The album's first single, "Hard Luck", was released on June 28, along with its accompanying music video.

On January 26, 2020, Tanya Tucker won her first two Grammy Awards for "Bring My Flowers Now" and "While I'm Livin'". Tucker released a live album, Live from the Troubadour on October 16, 2020. In a 2021 interview with Rolling Stone, Tucker revealed that she was working on a follow-up to While I'm Livin with Carlile and Jennings. During her 2022 set at Stagecoach Festival, Tucker revealed that her new album had been completed.

Outlaw image
Tucker is one of the few and best-known female country singers to be classified as an "Outlaw" in the Outlaw country movement, which was most popular in the late 1970s. As Tucker matured by the end of the 1970s, her Outlaw image grew. Like the other Outlaw artists in the business at the time (Johnny Cash, Willie Nelson, Kris Kristofferson, Waylon Jennings, Jessi Colter, Emmylou Harris, David Allan Coe, Hank Williams Jr.), Tucker was able to combine qualities of country and rock music into her voice to make the Outlaw sound that was popular at the time. These qualities could be heard on some of her biggest hits at the time, including 1978's "Texas (When I Die)". Tucker also had a spirit of independence, which was another Outlaw quality. She ranked number nine on CMT Greatest Outlaws: The Dirty Dozen, the only woman to appear on that list.

As the 1980s progressed, Tucker continued to add the Outlaw qualities to her hits. At the beginning of the 1990s, Tucker was still identified as an Outlaw. Today, Tucker continues to be recognized as one, regularly attending Outlaw events among regular shows. Gretchen Wilson made reference to Tucker in her 2004 hit song "Redneck Woman", and Tucker appears briefly in the video of the song, showing Tucker with other Outlaws.

The Return of Tanya Tucker
Decades after Tanya Tucker slipped from the spotlight, music star Brandi Carlile wrote an entire album for her hero based on Tanya's extraordinary life, spurring the greatest comeback in country music history.

The Return of Tanya Tucker featuring Brandi Carlile was released in NY and LA on October 21, 2022 and nationwide November 4. It was accompanied by the track "Ready As I'll Never Be".

Other works
Tanya appeared as a celebrity judge on Dance Fever in 1979.

Tucker published a 1997 autobiography, Nickel Dreams: My Life.

Tucker starred in her own reality show, Tuckerville, on TLC in 2005. It ran for two seasons for a total of 18 episodes. The show covers an in-depth visit with Tucker in her home with her family.

Tucker continues to perform for the military doing benefits with newer country acts such as Eric Agnew and Cole Deggs & the Lonesome. She has stated in interviews that she is filming new episodes of her reality show Tuckerville. Since Tucker has moved out of her Nashville home, the show will take place in Malibu, where she currently resides. It will be called Tucker Time. She stated that another reason for the name change is because TLC would not let them have the previous name.

In 2019, Tucker launched her own brand of tequila called, Cosa Salvaje.

Personal life
Tucker had relationships with various entertainers, most notably with Glen Campbell in the early 1980’s.  She also dated Merle Haggard, Andy Gibb, and Don Johnson.

Tucker later had a relationship with actor Ben Reed, with whom she had daughter Presley Tanita (born July 5, 1989) and son Beau "Grayson" (born October 2, 1991).

Tucker has had an on-again, off-again relationship with Jerry Laseter, a Nashville musician. They were engaged for the first time in 1997 and again in 1999. Just days before their 1999 wedding, Tucker canceled the ceremony when she discovered she was pregnant with her third child, Laseter's daughter Layla LaCosta (born June 25, 1999), saying she did not want to walk down the aisle pregnant in her wedding dress. Laseter was co-producer of Tucker's albums in 2002 (Tanya), 2005 (Live at Billy Bob's Texas), and 2009 (My Turn). 

One of Tucker's two brothers, Robert, died in September 2017 from pneumonia. Her surviving brother's name is Don.  Her sister is artist La Costa.

In 2022, Tucker sold her Brentwood, Tennessee, home (purchased three years earlier for $1,510,000) for $2,275,000.

Awards and nominations

DiscographyStudio albums'''

 Delta Dawn (1972)
 What's Your Mama's Name (1973)
 Would You Lay with Me (In a Field of Stone) (1974)
 Tanya Tucker (1975)
 Lovin' and Learnin' (1976)
 Here's Some Love (1976)
 Ridin' Rainbows (1977)
 TNT (1978)
 Tear Me Apart (1979)
 Dreamlovers (1980)
 Should I Do It (1981)
 Changes (1982)
 Girls Like Me (1986)
 Love Me Like You Used To (1987)
 Strong Enough to Bend (1988)
 Tennessee Woman (1990)
 Greatest Hits Encore (1990)
 What Do I Do with Me (1991)
 Can't Run from Yourself (1992)
 Soon (1993)
 Fire to Fire (1995)
 Complicated (1997)
 Tanya (2002)
 My Turn (2009)
 While I'm Livin' (2019)

Notes

References
 Cooper, Daniel (1998). "Tanya Tucker". In The Encyclopedia of Country Music''. Paul Kingsbury, Editor. New York: Oxford University Press. pp. 549–550.
 Harris, Stacy (1993)."The Best of Country: The Essential CD Guide." CollinsPublishers, San Francisco, pp. 89-90.

External links

 
 

1958 births
Living people
American women country singers
American country singer-songwriters
People from Seminole, Texas
Singer-songwriters from Texas
Grammy Award winners
American child singers
People from Willcox, Arizona
20th-century American women singers
21st-century American women singers
Country musicians from Texas
Country musicians from Arizona
20th-century American singers
21st-century American singers
Singer-songwriters from Arizona